Batrachedra tristicta is a species of moth in the family Batrachedridae. It is endemic to New Zealand and has been found in both the North and South Islands. The larvae feel on the flowers and seed heads of rushes in the genus Juncus. The adults of this species are on the wing in March.

Taxonomy
This species was first described by Edward Meyrick in 1901 using material collected at Makatoku, in the Hawkes Bay, in March. George Hudson discussed and illustrated this species both in his 1928 publication The Butterflies and Moths of New Zealand and his 1939 supplement to that work. The lectotype specimen is held at the Natural History Museum, London.

Description

Meyrick described B. tristicta as follows:

Distribution
This species is endemic to New Zealand. Along with the type locality in the Hawkes Bay, this species has also been collected in Fiordland.

Biology and behaviour

The adults of this species are on the wing in March.

Host species
The larvae feed on the flowers and seed heads of rushes, including wīwī (Juncus edgariae) and the introduced soft rush (Juncus effusus).

References

Batrachedridae
Moths of New Zealand
Moths described in 1901
Endemic fauna of New Zealand
Taxa named by Edward Meyrick
Endemic moths of New Zealand